This is a list of episodes for Fast N' Loud Season 7.

References 

2014 American television seasons